The 15th Vietnam Film Festival was held from November 20 to November 24, 2007 in Nam Định City, Nam Định Province, Vietnam, with the slogan "For a reformed and integrated Vietnam cinema" (Vietnamese: "Vì một nền điện ảnh Việt Nam đổi mới và hội nhập").

Event 
This is the first Film Festival with the participation of overseas Vietnamese filmmakers and foreign collaborative films. There were 113 films in attendance at the Film Festival: 25 feature films, 9 direct-to-video feature film, 53 documentary films, 9 science films và 17 animated films. The jury only awarded 2 Golden Lotus, one for the feature film: "Hà Nội, Hà Nội" and the other for the science film "Sự sống ở rừng Cúc Phương".

Participation 
This is the first film festival where the feature film section has a very high diversity: foreign elements, privately funded films, films by young directors, high-budget films, etc. The participation of 25 feature films comes from 9 units, of which 5 are state owned and 4 are private.

Within the prescribed time limit (from August 16, 2004 to August 16, 2007), a total of private film studios produced more than 15 feature films, 4-5 times more than at the time of the 14th festival.

As expected by the Organizing Committee, September 6, 2007 is the deadline to register to attend the 15th National Film Festival. But after this date, there are only 18 feature films, of which only the film "Dòng máu anh hùng" of Chánh Phương Film, registering to participate. According to Mr. Lê Ngọc Minh - Deputy Director of the Vietnam Cinema Department, some studios mistook the deadline for September 30, 2007, so the organizers postponed the deadline to this date, so after September 6, the Private film studios continue to receive invitations from the Cinema Department.

The 15th National Film Festival Organizing Committee also sent invitations to foreign film delegations such as the US, Russia, China, Japan, Korea, Laos, Cambodia (including managers, film artists) to attend. Foreign delegations brought films to screen in the outer circle with the nature of welcome, exchange and discussion.

Jury 
The judges were divided into 4 panels with 4 heads including: Đặng Nhật Minh (feature film), Vương Đức (direct-to-video feature film), Trần Thế Dân (documentary and science film), Mai Long (animated film). According to the new regulations of this year's Film Festival, the Head of Jury is also the official spokesman before the mouthpieces about the contents of the Film Festival.

This year, documentaries and scientific films are separated to award the Golden and Silver Lotus Awards, not together as every year.

For feature films, before the first screening of each film, the Organizing Committee will distribute votes to the audience to choose their favorite movies. This is considered an award voted by film festival audiences.

Activities 
Instead of holding the opening ceremony in the hall as usual, the opening ceremony of the 15th Film Festival was held in the square, in front of the Trần Hưng Đạo monument with the participation of thousands of guests and the people of Nam Định city. After the opening ceremony, there will be three large audience interactions with movie artists held at 3 locations: Nam Định City Sports Arena, the square in front of Bùi Chu Church and the square of Phu Day cultural tourist area.

Films participating in the festival will be released in turn at cinemas in Nam Định city: Tháng 8, Kim Đồng, Minh Khai, Student Cinema Center. Movie screenings in the evening will feature artists interacting with the audience. On this occasion, a talk and professional exchange at Vị Hoàng Hotel on the morning of November 22 was held to discuss the direction for Vietnamese cinema in the trend of integration and development, with the participation of many experts. face of international guests.

Festival followed the schedule below:
November 21: Meeting of delegation leaders, press conference, offering incense at Thiên Trường Temple, outdoor music and opening of the Film Festival.
November 22: Seminar on Vietnamese films, visit Bảo Lộc Temple and Phổ Minh Pagoda, interact with garment workers of Sông Hồng Company, interact with Nam Định audiences.
November 23: Visit the memorial house of the late General Secretary Trường Chinh, meet the people of Xuân Trường district, meet Nam Định students, interact with the people of Vụ Bản district, attend the Mẫu temple festival.
November 24: Visit Đinh - Lê temple relic, visit Nam Định city, closing ceremony of the film festival.

Inadequacy 
At this festival, the organizers distribute tickets to each agency and organization. This leads to the situation when the movie is shown, in one place the audience is all soldiers, in other places it is all workers or students. Thus, if there are lucky movies, they will find their right audience, and if there are unlucky movies, they will have to suffer from the wrong audience.

The film festival also received a series of criticisms about the organization, the lack of respect for the artists, the inadequacy in the judging criteria.

According to the information that the press present in Nam Định received before the closing ceremony, most of the members of the Jury gave their votes to "Mùa len trâu". The belief that "Mùa len trâu" won the award was further strengthened when director Nguyễn Võ Nghiêm Minh won the Best Director award. The result of the Golden Lotus given to "Hà Nội, Hà Nội" surprised everyone present in the final night, apart from the judges. Before that, "Hà Nội, Hà Nội" was never on the list of strong candidates.

Official Selection

Feature film 

Highlighted title indicates Golden Lotus winner.

Awards

Feature film

Direct-to-video

Documentary/Science film

Documentary film

Science film

Animated film

References 

Vietnam Film Festival
Vietnam Film Festival
Vietnam Film Festival
2007 in Vietnam